Sometimes called the bearded toadheads but better known by their scientific name of Phrynops this genus of turtles has often been a bit of a dumping ground for the short-necked South American turtles of the family Chelidae.

The genus is widely distributed in South America found in the Orinoco to Amazon and São Francisco to Paraná and adjacent river basins of Colombia, Venezuela, the Guianas, Brazil, Paraguay, Uruguay and northeastern Argentina (Iverson, 1992).

The phrynop turtle generally achieves thermoregulation through areal basking. In order to best attain their goal, they tend to increase their basking time during mid-day during the winters to make up for the cold. Other factors such as food intake and reproduction underwater also influence the way they control the temperature of their body. Although this is the main way they are able to maintain body temperature, food intake and reproduction rates are also influential in the matter.

Species 
Listed alphabetically by specific name.
 Phrynops geoffroanus (Schweigger, 1812) – Geoffroy's toadhead turtle or Geoffroy's side-necked turtle
 Phrynops hilarii (A.M.C. Duméril & Bibron, 1835) – Hilaire's toadhead turtle or Hilaire's side-necked turtle
 Phrynops tuberosus (W. Peters, 1870) – Cotinga River toadhead turtle
 Phrynops williamsi Rhodin & Mittermeier, 1983 – William's toadhead turtle, William's South American side-necked turtle
 †Phrynops paranaensis , from the Huayquerian Ituzaingó Formation of the Paraná Basin, Argentina

References 

 
Turtle genera
Turtles of South America
Reptiles described in 1830
Taxa named by Johann Georg Wagler
Taxonomy articles created by Polbot